Luo Pinchao (born ; June 1912 – July 15, 2010)  was a Cantonese opera stage actor who started to perform (as his career choice) in 1930. He was eventually recognized as the world's  oldest opera singer by the Guinness World Records.

Pinchao died in Guangzhou on July 15, 2010, at age 98.

Career
Returned to mainland China upon the birth of PRC, bringing along fellow convinced performers. Joined Communist Party and eventually became intellectual property of the State. Front and center on stage only when first returned to perform in Hong Kong with peer performers in the late 1970s. Shared stage and spotlight with PRC troupes of up-and-coming performers all over the world after those few performances.

By 1988, planned succession for offices was already in full force. Through communal spirit (instead of individual idolization or personal branding) among the Pinchao generation (grandfathered into the system in the 1950s), the Cultural Revolution and various other events, gone in this arena was life tenure. Collusion among the elders found in some other mainland Chinese Opera genre still, Hong Kong and all over the world generally in Cantonese opera, The Dog in the Manger, didn't survive in PRC.

True to his motto "life-long learning approach" (1988 biography) Pinchao continued the journey in the US, learning a new language - English as a Second Language (ESL). (Unadulterated by interpreter, as Fong Yim Fun, his former co-star on stage and in films, can move at will  between Cantonese and English or not is not known.) Gave lessons (to all, including different descent and nationality) in Chinatown while living in New York, USA since 1988 for citizenship. Bookends of his time (from inaugural as Vice-Chancellor in 1958 to artistic director in 1988) spent teaching in State training school are:-
Tsoi Kwok Hing, the first crop of graduates in the 1960s
Ting Fan (retired recently from office in 2017 at 63 years old) whom he hand-picked for training in the late 1970s

Lost count how many he groomed over decades of teaching when performed with six generations of students at one point. Performance on stage had been few and far between.

Very late in life, took under his wing a young student, grand-kid of an old friend. This is his only known opera or professional offspring. Also, he looked over the shoulders of his former students who held offices, gave lessons and took-up various responsibilities he left behind (as artistic director, Guangdong Cantonese Opera Institution in 1988) during his yearly returns to mainland while his speech always remained clear and diction was still good all along.

Repertoire select
Luo Cheng at the Gate
Often known as Luo Cheng writing a letter to emphasize hour-long scene with Pinchao standing on one foot while writing a letter with own (character's) blood.
Bandits of Shandong Province
Pinchao known for the scene in which the ride (a horse, the art of abstraction) was bridled and saddled.

Filmography select
White Poplar, Red Tears
Hongling's Blood (Part 1)
Hongling's Blood (Part 2)

Excerpt select
 Meeting at the Tower, Butterfly Lovers
 Waiting for the Moon in the Western Chamber, Romance of the Western Chamber

Personal life
Married (1944-1982) to Huang Bao-qiong until her death and produced one son.

Biography
Luo Pinchao qi zhuan by Lingyu Liu 羅品超奇傳; 劉伶玉 (In Chinese Only) Worldcat OCLC Number: 45637650

References

External links
 
 

1912 births
2010 deaths
Male Cantonese opera actors
People from Nanhai District
Male actors from Guangdong
Singers from Guangdong
20th-century Chinese male singers
21st-century Chinese male singers
20th-century Chinese male actors
21st-century Chinese male actors